Old Spanish Trail may refer to:

Old Spanish Trail (trade route), connecting Santa Fe, New Mexico, with Los Angeles, California, in the 19th century
Old Spanish Trail (auto trail), connecting St. Augustine, Florida, with San Diego, California, in the early 20th century